Robert Farthing, of Canterbury, Kent, was an English politician.

Family
Farthing was the son of Robert Farthing of Canterbury.

Career
Farthing was a Member of Parliament for Canterbury, Kent in 1394 and September 1397.

References

Year of birth missing
Year of death missing
14th-century births
English MPs 1394
People from Canterbury
English MPs September 1397